Jaroslav Hanf (19 February 1888 – 21 February 1958) was a Czech equestrian. He competed at the 1924 Summer Olympics and the 1928 Summer Olympics.

References

External links
 

1888 births
1958 deaths
Czech male equestrians
Czech dressage riders
Olympic equestrians of Czechoslovakia
Equestrians at the 1924 Summer Olympics
Equestrians at the 1928 Summer Olympics
Place of birth missing